Condor Huayin (possibly from Quechua kuntur condor, Ancash Quechua wayi house, "condor house", -n a suffix) is a mountain in the Andes of Peru, about  high. It is situated in the Lima Region, Oyon Province, Oyon District. Condor Huayin lies on a ridge which extends from north to south southeast of the Huayhuash mountain range and southwest of the Raura mountain range. The peak south of Condor Huayin at the very end of the ridge is named Shapra (local Quechua for "beard").

References

Mountains of Peru
Mountains of Lima Region